Carema is a comune (municipality) in the Metropolitan City of Turin in the Italian region Piedmont, located about  north of Turin.

Carema borders the following municipalities: Perloz, Lillianes, Donnas, Pont-Saint-Martin, Settimo Vittone, and Quincinetto. It is home to the production of the Carema red wine.

References

Cities and towns in Piedmont